Sepa-Teluti is an Austronesian language of Seram Island in eastern Indonesia.

References

Central Maluku languages
Languages of Indonesia
Seram Island